The Last Tunnel is a 1987 Mexican drama film directed by Servando González. The film was selected as the Mexican entry for the Best Foreign Language Film at the 61st Academy Awards, but was not accepted as a nominee.

Cast
 David Reynoso as Manuel Iglesias 'El Mayor'
 Gerardo Zepeda as Pequeño
 Enrique Lucero as Juan Penagos
 Ignacio Guadalupe as Julián
 Holda Ramírez as Anarica
 Pablo Ortega as Oromi
 Claudio Sorel as Beltrán

See also
 List of submissions to the 61st Academy Awards for Best Foreign Language Film
 List of Mexican submissions for the Academy Award for Best Foreign Language Film

References

External links
 

1987 films
1987 drama films
1980s Spanish-language films
Mexican drama films
1980s Mexican films